Pierina Alejandra Montenegro Ventura (born 12 August 1986) is a Uruguayan footballer who plays as a defender for Canelones–Fénix and the Uruguay women's national team.

International career
Montenegro capped for Uruguay during the 2018 Copa América Femenina.

References 

1986 births
Living people
Uruguayan women's footballers
Uruguay women's international footballers
Women's association football defenders
Club Nacional de Football players
Centro Atlético Fénix players